Doomed is a 2013 novel by Chuck Palahniuk. It is the second novel in a trilogy that started with Damned.

Plot
Doomed follows Madison Spencer after she escapes from Hell, doomed to wander Earth in a state of purgatory for a year, haunting her parents. Doomed gives us a clearer view of Madison's childhood and explains why she was damned to Hell.

References

2013 American novels
Novels by Chuck Palahniuk
Sequel novels
Fiction about purgatory
Doubleday (publisher) books